Andrey Vladimirovich Lebedev (born 2 January 1963) is a Russian retired professional footballer.

References

1963 births
Living people
Soviet footballers
Russian footballers
Russian Premier League players
Russian expatriate footballers
Expatriate footballers in Sweden
FC Lokomotiv Moscow players
FC Asmaral Moscow players
FC Spartak Vladikavkaz players
FC Shinnik Yaroslavl players
FC Lokomotiv Nizhny Novgorod players
FC Rubin Kazan players
Soviet First League players
Association football midfielders
IK Brage players
FC FShM Torpedo Moscow players
Allsvenskan players